Shyam Sunder may refer to:

Shyam Sunder (economist) (born 1944), accounting theorist and experimental economist
Shyam Sunder, protagonist in books written by Madhu Babu
B. Shyam Sunder (1908–1975), Indian intellectual and public figure
S. Shyam Sunder, lead investigator of the Collapse of the World Trade Center
Shyam Sundar Chakravarthy, Indian revolutionary
Shyam Sunder Goenka (born 1932), Indian entrepreneur
Shyam Sunder Kapoor (born 1938), Indian nuclear physicist
Shyam Sunder Patidar, Indian politician from Madhya Pradesh
Shyam Sunder Rao, Indian volleyball player
Shyam Sunder Sharma, Indian politician
Shyam Sunder Surolia, Indian freedom fighter
Shyam Sunder Vyas (1922–2009), Indian freedom fighter, journalist, and philanthropist

See also
Shyam (disambiguation)
Sunder (disambiguation)
Shyamasundara, a name of Krishna